The canton of Châtellerault-3 is an administrative division of the Vienne department, western France. It was created at the French canton reorganisation which came into effect in March 2015. Its seat is in Châtellerault.

It consists of the following communes:
 
Châtellerault (partly)
Chenevelles
Coussay-les-Bois
Leigné-les-Bois
Lésigny
Mairé
Pleumartin
La Roche-Posay
Senillé-Saint-Sauveur
Vicq-sur-Gartempe

References

Cantons of Vienne